Physical medium may refer to:
 Transmission medium, a medium used in the propagation of energy waves
 Physical mediumship, the manipulation of energies and energy systems by spirits

See also
 Physical media, physical materials that are used to store or transmit information in data communications